Welcome is an unincorporated community in Whatcom County, in the U.S. state of Washington.

History
A post office called Welcome was established in 1889, and remained in operation until 1917. John Welcome Riddle, an early postmaster, gave the community his middle name.

References

Unincorporated communities in Whatcom County, Washington
Unincorporated communities in Washington (state)